Allium albotunicatum is a plant species found in Israel, Turkey, Syria and Lebanon. It is a bulb-forming perennial with greenish-brown flowers.

References

albotunicatum
Onions
Plants described in 1934
Flora of Western Asia